H.Q. British Forces, Aden was a command of the Royal Air Force (RAF) established on 14 April 1942 by renaming the Aden Command. The components of H.Q. British Forces, Aden are indicated below for two dates during World War II. 

H.Q. British Forces Aden primarily conducted antisubmarine warfare operations and escort missions as a sub-command of RAF Middle East Command, which itself was a sub-command of Mediterranean Air Command following a major reorganization of the Allied air forces in the North African and Mediterranean Theater of Operations (MTO) in February 1943.

On 6 October 1956, H.Q. British Forces, Aden was renamed H.Q. British Forces, Arabian Peninsula.

References

Military history of Aden during World War II
Military units and formations of the Royal Air Force in World War II
Military units and formations in Aden in World War II
Military units and formations established in 1942